Zakrisson is a surname. Notable people with the surname include:

Anna Zakrisson (born 1980), Swedish science communicator and scientist
Kristina Zakrisson (born 1956), Swedish politician

See also
 Zachrisson

Swedish-language surnames